2016 Asia Kabaddi Cup was the third season of the Asia Kabaddi Cup hosted by Pakistan which commenced from May 2, 2016, in Pakistan Ordnance Factory Sports Complex, Wah Cantt. The final of this event was played on May 6. The event was broadcast live on PTV Sports.

The five Asian Kabaddi teams that came to play in this event were Pakistan, Afghanistan, India, Iran, and Sri Lanka. The final was played between Pakistan and India whereas  Afghanistan and Iran played for 3rd and 4th place.

Teams

Matches

Day 1

Day 2

Day 3

Day 4

Day 5

References

Kabaddi competitions in Pakistan